Mariana Francisca Loyola Ruz (Santiago, 2 August 1975) is a Chilean theater, film, and television actress. Loyola began to work regularly in the theater until in 2001 she was cast in the telenovela Amores de mercado.  That same year she made her feature film debut with Andrés Wood's La fiebre del loco followed by Sub Terra and Cachimba. Further appearances in television projects such as Machos followed, as did inclusion in the international cast of El baile de la Victoria.

She has been the winner of the main awards in her country, two APES, an Altazor Award, a Pedro Sienna Awards and a Caleuche Award. In addition, an award at the Festival de Cine Iberoamericano de Huelva and an award at the Cartagena Film Festival.

Filmography

Film

Telenovelas

TV Series

References

External links 
 

1975 births
Actresses from Santiago
Chilean stage actresses
Chilean film actresses
Chilean television actresses
Chilean telenovela actresses
Living people